Noz may refer to:

 NOz, certain types of nitrogen oxide
 Bugul Noz (night shepherd), a night creature in Breton mythology
 Fest Noz (night festival), a traditional Breton festival
 Nayi language (ISO 639:noz), spoken in western Ethiopia
 Neue Osnabrücker Zeitung, a German newspaper
 Spichenkovo Airport (IATA: NOZ), in Kemerovo Oblast, Russia

See also
 Nož (disambiguation)